Ayhan Elmastaşoğlu (born 23 August 1941) is a retired Turkish professional footballer. Elmastaşoğlu is best known for his 12 year stint with Galatasaray from 1960-1972. He helped Galatasaray win 5 Süper Ligs, 4 Turkish Cups, and 2 Turkish Super Cups.

International career
Elmastaşoğlu was a youth international for Turkey, and represented the senior Turkey team 19 times. He debuted for Turkey in a 1966 FIFA World Cup qualification 1-0 loss to Portugal on 19 April 1964.

Personal life
Elmastaşoğlu's brothers, Ayfer and Nail, were also professional footballers.

Honours
Galatasaray
 Süper Lig: 1961-62, 1962-63, 1968-1969, 1970-1971, 1971-1972
 Turkish Cup: 1962-63, 1963-64, 1964-65, 1965-66
 Turkish Super Cup: 1966, 1969

Turkey
ECO Cup: 1967

References

External links
TFF Profile
Mackolik Profile
NFT Profile

1941 births
Living people
Footballers from İzmir
Turkish footballers
Turkey youth international footballers
Turkey under-21 international footballers
Turkey international footballers
Association football midfielders
Süper Lig players
Altay S.K. footballers
Galatasaray S.K. footballers
Sakaryaspor footballers